A sequent is a formalized statement of provability used within sequent calculus.

Sequent may also refer to:

 Sequent (MUD), text-based online game software
 Sequent Computer Systems, a defunct computer hardware company